The 1956 Lehigh Engineers football team was an American football team that represented Lehigh University during the 1956 NCAA College Division football season. Lehigh won the Middle Three Conference championship.

In their 11th year under head coach William Leckonby, the Engineers compiled a 7–2 record and defeated both Middle Three Conference opponents. Alex Maslowsky was the team captain.

Lehigh played its home games at Taylor Stadium on the university's main campus in Bethlehem, Pennsylvania.

Schedule

References

Lehigh
Lehigh Mountain Hawks football seasons
Lehigh Engineers football